Thieves' Gold is a 1918 American Western film directed by John Ford and featuring Harry Carey. It is considered to be a lost film.

Plot
Cheyenne Harry tries to help his outlaw friend Padden evade arrest after Padden has drunkenly shot another man. In the end, the two mismatched friends fight it out, leaving Padden dead. In a romantic subplot, Harry's fiancée Alice leaves him, but finally returns.

Cast
 Harry Carey as Cheyenne Harry
 Molly Malone as Alice Norris
 John Cook as Uncle Larkin
 Martha Mattox as Mrs. Larkin
 Vester Pegg as Curt Simmons aka "Padden"
 Harry Tenbrook as "Colonel" Betoski
 Helen Ware as Mrs. Savage
 L. M. Wells as Savage
 Millard K. Wilson as undetermined role

Production
Thieves' Gold was released as a Universal Special Feature in 1918. It was a 50-minute silent film on five reels, part of the "Cheyenne Harry" series of film featurettes. The original story, "Back to the Right Train" by Frederick R. Bechdolt, was adapted for the screen by scenarist George Hively. This installment of "Cheyenne Harry" won notably negative reviews by critics at the time of its release.

Reception
Like many American films of the time, Thieves' Gold was subject to cuts by city and state film censorship boards. For example, the Chicago Board of Censors cut, in Reel 2, six scenes of women at bar and women drinking, flashed two scenes of tough dancing by Cheyenne Harry and young woman, Harry shooting a Mexican, Reel 4, four holdup scenes, Reel 5, shooting of Padden, two scenes of Harry shooting.

See also
 John Ford filmography
 Harry Carey filmography
 List of lost films

References

External links

 
 

1918 films
1918 Western (genre) films
1918 lost films
American black-and-white films
Films directed by John Ford
Lost Western (genre) films
Lost American films
Silent American Western (genre) films
1910s American films